NGC 1856 is a young, massive star cluster similar to a "blue globular cluster" in the Magellanic Clouds in the constellation Dorado.  Its age is estimated to be 80 million years.  The object was discovered in 1826 by James Dunlop with a 9-inch reflecting telescope.

Sources

External links
 

1856
Dorado (constellation)
Globular clusters